Bruno (died 1124) was the archbishop of Trier from 1101 until his death. He was a relative of the Emperor Henry IV and a priest of Trier Cathedral prior to his election. He was invested with his office by the emperor amidst controversy.

With Duke Frederick I of Swabia and Archbishop Frederick I of Cologne, Bruno was part of a delegation sent by Henry IV to his rebellious son Henry V in early 1105. The job of the delegates was "somehow to reconcile" father and son, but they failed, since the younger Henry refused to have anything to do with his excommunicate father.

In 1107 Bruno founded Springiersbach Abbey out of a bequest left to the church by a ministerialis named Benigna, who had belonged to the Count Palatine Siegfried of Orlamünde.

Notes

Sources

Archbishops of Trier

1040s births
1124 deaths

Year of birth uncertain